Nam Pakan  is a river of Laos. It flows through Khammouane Province and Savannakhet Province.

References

Rivers of Laos
Geography of Savannakhet province
Geography of Khammouane province